Hiram Iddings Bearss (April 13, 1875 – August 28, 1938) was an officer of the United States Marine Corps who received the Medal of Honor for heroism during the Philippine–American War and the Distinguished Service Cross for his valor in World War I.

Early life and education
Hiram was born April 13, 1875, in Peru, Indiana, to Frank and Desdemona Bearss. His father was away on business at the time, but upon returning was informed that his son, "Mike" had been born. Through most of his youth Mike did not seem to like his given name of Hiram and was prone to fighting anyone who used it. He had one brother, Braxton and three sisters, Emmy, Desdemona and Lucy. As a child he got into a lot of trouble, frequently getting into fights and defying those in authority positions above him, including his parents. In addition to the trouble he got into, he also had difficulty in school but managed to do well enough to continue his education. As a young boy, he found an interest in horses and became a good rider, winning a horse race when he was only six. When he was a teenager he ran away from home but was found by his father, several weeks later, tending to some prize horses in a distant town. After convincing his father to let him continue caring for the animals he returned home. Along with his love of horses he was also a good athlete and enjoyed playing football and baseball.

When he was a teenager his father got him into the Notre Dame preparatory school where he continued playing sports, getting into fights and playing pranks on the teachers and other students. Although he completed the first year, even making the honor roll for a few months, he was not allowed to return. During the summer, he played baseball in his hometown of Peru and continued to do so every summer for the next several years. The next year, he again attempted school, this time at a preparatory school for Purdue University where he only lasted a few months. After accepting a large donation from his father, Depauw University accepted Hiram and while there he played on the school football team. Although he was smaller than the other players and the coach was afraid he would get hurt, he did fairly well. The next year, he was not accepted back to Depauw and his father sent him to yet another school, much farther from home, along with his brother. Norwich University in Northfield, Vermont, was a military school and did not tolerate Hirams pranks and troublemaking. After the first couple months, he planned to leave but was convinced to stay by his brother Braxton. He played football and again found himself in trouble several times and on one occasion threw a potato at a waiter in the mess hall. He liked wearing the school uniform and his weapon, but he frequently dropped it in formation when he became angry at the drill sergeant. Hiram and his brother made it through the first year at Norwich and a second as well but at the age of 21 Hiram had enough of school and was looking for something more adventurous.

Military career
Bearss was commissioned in the United States Marine Corps on 26 May 1899 and was promoted to the rank of captain on 23 July 1900.  In 1901 he was stationed in the Philippines where he earned the Medal of Honor for heroism in combat on the island of Samar where he led a successful attack on a heavily defended insurgent position.

During World War I, Bearss had risen to the rank of colonel and served in France as commander of the 5th Marine Regiment, taking over from Charles A. Doyen, part of the 4th Marine Brigade. Wendell Cushing Neville took over from him in January 1918. He later commanded the 102nd Infantry (a unit of the Army's 26th Division) at Marcheville in 1918, for which he was awarded the Distinguished Service Cross and the Navy Distinguished Service Medal.

Bearss retired from the Marine Corps in 1919 and made his residence in his home state of Indiana.  He was a delegate from Indiana to the 1936 Republican National Convention.

Death
Bearss died August 28, 1938, in an automobile collision in Columbia City, Indiana, while en route from Chicago to Peru, Indiana. He was buried there in Mount Hope Cemetery.

Awards and honors

Military decorations
Bearss received 19 military decorations in his 20 years of service including several for his actions in combat. These include decorations from the United States and other countries. From the United States he received the Medal of Honor, Distinguished Service Cross, Navy Distinguished Service Medal and the Army Distinguished Service Medal.

In addition to these decorations he also received awards from other countries for his conduct in battle from France, Belgium and Italy. From France he received the Légion d'honneur officer class and the Fourragère. He also received the Croix de Guerre with two palms from France as well as the Italian War Merit Cross and the Belgian Croix de Guerre.

He also received campaign medals for the various wars and battles he fought in which included the Navy Expeditionary Medal with three numerals, Spanish Campaign Medal, Philippine Campaign Medal, Mexican Service Medal, Dominican Campaign Medal, World War I Victory Medal with battle clasps for Aisne, Aisne-Marne and St. Mihiel and the Meuse-Argonne defensive clasp.

Medal of Honor citation
The President of the United States takes pleasure in the name of The Congress in presenting the MEDAL OF HONOR to

for service in Samar, P. I., as set forth in the following CITATION:

For extraordinary heroism and eminent and conspicuous conduct in battle at the junction of the Cadacan and Sohoton Rivers, Samar, P. I., November 17, 1901. Colonel Bearss, then Captain, second in command of the column upon their uniting ashore in the Sohoton region, made a surprise attack on the fortified cliffs and capturing and destroying a powder magazine, 40 lantacas (guns), rice, food and cuartels. Due to his courage, intelligence, discrimination and zeal, he successfully led his men up the cliffs [by] means of bamboo ladders to a height of 200 feet. The cliffs were of soft stone of volcanic origin, in the nature of pumice and were honeycombed with caves. Tons of rocks were suspended in platforms held in position by vine cables (known as bejuco) in readiness to be precipitated upon people below. After driving the insurgents from their position which was almost impregnable, being covered with numerous trails lined with poisoned spears, pits, etc., he led his men across the river, scaled the cliffs on the opposite side, and destroyed the camps there. He and the men under his command overcame incredible difficulties and dangers in destroying positions which according to reports from old prisoners, had taken three years to perfect, were held as a final rallying point, and were never before penetrated by white troops. Captain Bearss also rendered distinguished public service in the presence of the enemy at Quinapundan River, Samar, P. I., on January 19, 1902.

/S/ T. ROOSEVELT

Distinguished Service Cross
Citation:
The President of the United States of America, authorized by Act of Congress, July 9, 1918, takes pleasure in presenting the Distinguished Service Cross to Colonel Hiram Iddings Bearss (MCSN: 0-1102), United States Marine Corps, for extraordinary heroism while attached to the 102d Infantry Regiment (Army), 26th Division, A.E.F., in action at Marcheville and Riaville, France, 26 September 1918. Colonel Bearss' indomitable courage and leadership led to the complete success of the attack by two battalions of his regiment on Marcheville and Riaville. During the attacks these two towns changed hands four times, finally remaining in our possession until the troops were ordered to withdraw. Under terrific machine-gun and artillery fire, Colonel Bearss was the first to enter Marcheville, where he directed operations. Later, upon finding his party completely surrounded, he personally assisted in fighting the enemy off with pistol and hand grenades.

Army Distinguished Service Medal
Citation:
The President of the United States of America, authorized by Act of Congress, July 9, 1918, takes pleasure in presenting the Army Distinguished Service Medal to Colonel Hiram Iddings Bearss (MCSN: 0-1102), United States Marine Corps, for exceptionally meritorious and distinguished services to the Government of the United States, in a duty of great responsibility during World War I. Colonel Bearss commanded with distinction the 102d Infantry Regiment, 26th Division, achieving notable success in the active operations in which that regiment was engaged. By his untiring energy and dauntless courage in overcoming the numerous difficulties confronting him, he gave proof of military leadership of high order.

Navy Distinguished Service Medal
Citation:
The President of the United States of America takes pleasure in presenting the Navy Distinguished Service Medal to Colonel Hiram Iddings Bearss (MCSN: 0-1102), United States Marine Corps, for exceptionally meritorious and distinguished services. Colonel Bearss commanded with distinction the 102d Infantry Regiment (Army), 26th Division, achieving notable success in the active operations in which that regiment was engaged. By his untiring energy and dauntless courage in overcoming the numerous difficulties confronting him, he gave proof of military leadership of high order.

Legacy

USS Bearss
The ship was sponsored by General Bearss widow and commissioned April 12, 1944.

Marine Corps League
The Marine Corps League Detachment located in Indianapolis, Indiana named their unit  Hiram I. Bearss Detachment in his honor.

See also

List of Medal of Honor recipients
List of Philippine–American War Medal of Honor recipients

References

Further reading

External links

1875 births
1938 deaths
Burials in Indiana
Military personnel from Indiana
United States Marine Corps personnel of World War I
United States Marine Corps Medal of Honor recipients
American military personnel of the Philippine–American War
Recipients of the Distinguished Service Cross (United States)
United States Marine Corps generals
Road incident deaths in Indiana
People from Peru, Indiana
DePauw Tigers football players
Norwich Cadets football players
Recipients of the Navy Distinguished Service Medal
Philippine–American War recipients of the Medal of Honor